Secret Agent Barbie or Barbie: Secret Agent is a multi platform video game released in 2001 for Microsoft Windows and Game Boy Advance. It follows Barbie as a spy secret agent doing missions all over the world.

Secret Agent Barbie: Royal Jewels Mission

Plot 
Secret Agent Barbie: Royal Jewels Mission is a 2D action platformer released for the GBA. The Queen's Jewels are stolen by the antagonist, Camille. Barbie travels to England, China, Italy, and Mexico collecting secret files while dodging guards to recover the Queen's Jewels and catch the thief.

Reception 

Secret Agent Barbie: Royal Jewels Mission received "mixed or average" reviews, according to review aggregator Metacritic.

IGN called the game "the best Metal Gear knock-off that the GBA has at the moment," and praised its surprising complexity. GameZone praised the animation, color, sound, and background music of the PC version.

Secret Agent Barbie

Plot 
Secret Agent Barbie is a 3D action game released for Microsoft Windows. Barbie and her friends are secret agents and are called to New York by Teresa to help with her fashion show. Someone has stolen the cloth and plans to make an invisibility suit. It is up to Barbie to stop the thief. Barbie travels to Paris, New York, Egypt, Tokyo, and Rio in order to solve the mystery and find the plans.

Reception 
GameZone praised the animation, color, sound, and background music of the PC version.

References 

2001 video games
Barbie video games
Game Boy Advance games
Windows games
Adventure games
Platform games
Single-player video games
Spy video games
Video games set in England
Video games set in China
Video games set in Italy
Video games set in Mexico
Video games set in Paris
Video games set in New York City
Video games set in Egypt
Video games set in Tokyo
Video games set in Brazil